The Alfred Newton Lecture is an academic prize lecture awarded by the British Ornithologists' Union.  It is named for Alfred Newton.

Lecturers 

 1994 Ian Newton
 1995 Janet Kear
 1998 Jared Diamond
 2003 Chris Perrins
 2009 Tim Birkhead
 2018 Hugh Possingham
 2019 Lei Cao
 2021 Carl Jones
 2022 Nicholas B. Davies

References 

Ornithology in the United Kingdom